Julen Etxabeguren Leanizbarrutia (born 7 March 1991) is a Spanish footballer who plays as a centre back for SD Beasain.

Etxabeguren started his career in his native Basque Country with Real Sociedad, but did not break into their first team. He moved to Scotland in 2014 to study and signed for East Fife. After playing for East Fife in Scottish League Two for six months, he signed a contract with Scottish Premiership side Dundee.

Career

Real Sociedad
After coming through the youth system at Real Sociedad, Etxabeguren progressed to their B-team where he was a regular for four years. In the 2013–14 season, he trained with the first team during pre-season and was named in their Champions League squad. He was then affected by injury. Despite being offered a new contract, he decided to give up football.

East Fife
Etxabeguren moved to Scotland to study for a master's degree in electronic engineering at the University of Edinburgh. When he had nearly concluded that course, he considered resuming his football career. Etxabeguren signed for semi-professional club East Fife, playing in Scottish League Two, in December 2014. This was considered a surprising move for a player who had been at a relatively high level. Etxabeguren quickly became a cult hero with the Methil club, with his arrival coinciding with an improvement in the team's form.

Dundee
On 2 June 2015, Dundee confirmed that Etxabeguren had signed a three-year deal with the club and would begin pre-season training in July. He became a regular in the side, featuring in 40 Scottish Premiership matches between July 2015 and March 2017 despite needing surgery on an eye injury in January 2016, but then ruptured his achilles tendon in a match against Partick Thistle which resulted in a seven-month layoff. After returning in October 2017, he only made one appearance from the bench before sustaining a dislocated shoulder. Etxabeguren was released by Dundee at the end of the season.

Career statistics

References

External links
 
 
 

1991 births
Living people
Footballers from Madrid
Footballers from the Basque Country (autonomous community)
Spanish footballers
Association football defenders
Alumni of the University of Edinburgh
Real Sociedad B footballers
East Fife F.C. players
Dundee F.C. players
Real Unión footballers
Segunda División B players
Tercera División players
Scottish Professional Football League players
Spanish expatriate footballers
Expatriate footballers in Scotland
Spanish expatriate sportspeople in Scotland
SD Beasain footballers